Becknell Creek is a stream located in the U.S. state of California. It is located in Mariposa County.

References

Rivers of Northern California
Rivers of Mariposa County, California